The clivus (Latin for "slope"), or Blumenbach clivus, is a bony part of the cranium at the base of the skull. It is a shallow depression behind the dorsum sellae of the sphenoid bone. It slopes gradually to the anterior part of the basilar occipital bone at its junction with the sphenoid bone. It extends to the foramen magnum. It is related to the pons and the abducens nerve (CN VI).

Structure 
The clivus is a shallow depression behind the dorsum sellae of the sphenoid bone. It slopes gradually to the anterior part of the basilar occipital bone at its junction with the sphenoid bone. Synchondrosis of these two bones forms the clivus. The clivus extends inferiorly to the foramen magnum. On axial planes, it sits just posterior to the sphenoid sinuses. It is medial to the foramen lacerum (the internal carotid artery reaches the middle cranial fossa above the foramen lacerum), proximal to its anastomosis with the Circle of Willis. It is anterior to the basilar artery. On sagittal plane, it can be divided into two surfaces including the pharyngeal (inferior) surface and basilar (superior) surface. A small elevation known as the pharyngeal tubercle is present on the inferior surface for the fibrous raphe of pharynx to attach. 

The pons sits on the basilar surface of the clivus. The abducens nerve (CN VI) also tracks along the clivus during its course.

Variations 
During embryonic development, the clivus is formed by the fusion of the basiocciput and basisphenoid or also known as the sphenooccipital synchondrosis. When the fusion occurs improperly, it would give rise to gaps that are considered anatomical variations. Variations of the clivus include fossa navicularis magna, craniopharyngeal canal, canalis basilaris medianus, and transverse basilar fissure (Saucer's fissure). Ossification of the apical ligament of dens may also occur, resulting in a variant bony tubercle at the inferior end of the clivus. Condylus tertius and arcus praebasiocipitalis are the other two variations that can be found at the lower end of the clivus, although their etiology may be different from the other variations. Ecchordosis physaliphora, a congenital benign lesion derived from the notochord, might be present in the dorsal part of the clivus. This lesion is harmless is considered an anatomical variant.

Clinical importance 
The abducens nerve (CN VI) tracks along the clivus during its course. Increased intracranial pressure can trap the nerve at this point and cause signs of palsy.

The clivus is also the site for chordoma, a rare type of cancer.

Surgery 
Surgery for lesions involving the clivus and surrounding structures have traditionally been approached via extended subfrontal transbasal, anterior transfacial, lateral transtemporal, far-lateral approaches, and staged approaches. These approaches are limited in that they often require extensive bone removal and brain retraction while placing critical neurovascular structures between the surgeon and the site of pathology. It has been proposed that these limitations are mitigated by significant advancements in the use of endoscopic endonasal surgery. Contemporary surgical approaches involving extended endoscopic endonasal approaches to the clivus have been increasingly described by several groups, and have been shown to be a safe and effective strategy for the surgical management of a variety of benign and malignant lesions.

Relation of the clivus and dens 
The clivus is an important landmark for checking for anatomical atlanto-occipital alignment. When viewed on a lateral C-spine radiograph, the clivus forms a line which, if extended, is known as Wackenheim's clivus line. Wackenheim's clivus line should pass through the dens of the axis or be tangential to it.

History 
"Clivus" is also used as an abbreviated term for the clivus ocularis, which is the sloping inner wall of the retina as it dips into the foveola in the macula of the eye. To disambiguate, the clivus is sometimes referred to as the Blumenbach clivus. This is named after Johann Friedrich Blumenbach.

Additional images

See also 
 Pharyngeal tubercle

References

External links 
  - "Osteology of the Skull: Internal Surface of Skull"
 Diagram at uwo.ca

Bones of the head and neck